The Caprices of Kitty is a 1915 American comedy silent film directed by Phillips Smalley and written by Elsie Janis. The film stars Elsie Janis, Courtenay Foote, Herbert Standing, Vera Lewis, Martha Mattox and Myrtle Stedman. The film was released on March 8, 1915, by Paramount Pictures.

Plot

Cast 
Elsie Janis as Katherine Bradley 
Courtenay Foote as Gerald Cameron
Herbert Standing as Kitty's Guardian
Vera Lewis as Miss Smyth
Martha Mattox as Miss Rawlins
Myrtle Stedman as Elaine Vernon

Preservation status
A print of the film is preserved in the Library of Congress collection Packard Campus Culpepper.

References

External links 
 

1915 films
1910s English-language films
Silent American comedy films
1915 comedy films
Paramount Pictures films
American black-and-white films
American silent feature films
1910s American films